Denilho Cleonise (born 8 December 2001) is a Dutch professional footballer who plays as a winger for FC Twente. Besides the Netherlands, he has played in Italy.

Career
A youth product of AFC Ajax, in 2013 he left the club to join Zeeburgia. In 2015 he went to AZ Alkmaar, where he played for two years before returning to Ajax. In 2018 he left The Lancers once again to join the youth academy of Genoa in 2018. On 9 November 2019, Cleonise made his professional debut with Genoa in a 0–0 Serie A tie with Napoli.

In August 2021, Cleonise joined FC Twente on a free transfer, with Genoa holing a sell-on clause for the player.

Personal life
Born in the Netherlands, Cleonise is of Surinamese descent.

References

External links
 

2001 births
Living people
Footballers from Amsterdam
Association football wingers
Dutch footballers
Dutch people of Mozambican descent
Dutch sportspeople of Surinamese descent
Serie A players
Eredivisie players
Genoa C.F.C. players
FC Twente players
Dutch expatriate footballers
Dutch expatriate sportspeople in Italy
Expatriate footballers in Italy